Sun Yu (born 28 February 1994) is a Chinese badminton player. She was part of the Chinese winning team of the 2014 and the 2016 Uber Cup.

After a long struggle from serious injury problems, she officially announced her retirement from the national team on 16 August 2018, and from the international badminton circuit in 2019, at a very young age of 25. The last tournament she played was the 2017 World Championships where she ended her campaign as quarter-finalist.

Achievements

World Junior Championships 
Girls' singles

Asian Junior Championships 
Girls' singles

BWF Superseries 
The BWF Superseries, which was launched on 14 December 2006 and implemented in 2007, was a series of elite badminton tournaments, sanctioned by the Badminton World Federation (BWF). BWF Superseries levels were Superseries and Superseries Premier. A season of Superseries consisted of twelve tournaments around the world that had been introduced since 2011. Successful players were invited to the Superseries Finals, which were held at the end of each year.

Women's singles

  BWF Superseries Finals tournament
  BWF Superseries Premier tournament
  BWF Superseries tournament

BWF Grand Prix 
The BWF Grand Prix had two levels, the Grand Prix and Grand Prix Gold. It was a series of badminton tournaments sanctioned by the Badminton World Federation (BWF) and played between 2007 and 2017.

Women's singles

  BWF Grand Prix Gold tournament
  BWF Grand Prix tournament

Record against selected opponents 
Record against year-end Finals finalists, World Championships semi-finalists, and Olympic quarter-finalists.

References

External links 
 

1994 births
Living people
Badminton players from Dalian
Chinese female badminton players
Universiade medalists in badminton
Universiade silver medalists for China
Medalists at the 2013 Summer Universiade